KM de Vantagens Hall may refer to:

 KM de Vantagens Hall (Belo Horizonte), an events centre
 KM de Vantagens Hall (Rio de Janeiro), a music venue